Kim Hyun-joon (born 27 October 1987) is a South Korean former professional tennis player.

A left-handed player from Seoul, Kim featured in four Davis Cup ties for South Korea across 2010 and 2011, winning two singles and one doubles rubber. He was a silver medalist in mixed doubles at the 2009 Universiade in Belgrade and was a men's doubles bronze medalist at the 2010 Asian Games, which were held in Guangzhou.

See also
List of South Korea Davis Cup team representatives

References

External links
 
 
 

1987 births
Living people
South Korean male tennis players
Universiade medalists in tennis
Universiade silver medalists for South Korea
Medalists at the 2009 Summer Universiade
Asian Games medalists in tennis
Asian Games bronze medalists for South Korea
Medalists at the 2010 Asian Games
Tennis players at the 2010 Asian Games
21st-century South Korean people